Laldighi Mosque is an ancient mosque located at Laldighi, in Badarganj upazila of Rangpur district, Bangladesh.

History
The mosque is believed to be built in the late 17th to early 18th century. The exact date of construction is not known. There was an inscription tablet located near the eastern facade of the mosque, but this has gone missing. According to Banglapedia, the mosque's architectural style is similar to nearby mosques (such as the Gorai Mosque 1680, of Kishoreganj, and the Chaksri Mosque, circa late 17th century, of Bagerhat).

The mosque fell into disuse, and was abandoned. During the late British rule in Bengal, this mosque was re-discovered, and cleared of the thick vegetation.

Architecture
This mosques architecture is similar to Mughal sculptures.

See also
 List of mosques in Bangladesh

References

Mosques in Bangladesh
Rangpur District
Rangpur Division